An automated pool cleaner is a vacuum cleaner that is designed to collect debris and sediment from swimming pools with minimal human intervention.

History

Evolution 
Swimming pool cleaners evolved from the water filter and early cistern cleaners. The forerunner of today's pool cleaners were cistern cleaners; they were developed due to the need to clean pools and cisterns. Thermae were well-known for their elaborate cisterns and prevalent in the early United States. The United States Patent and Trademark Office refers to a cistern cleaner patent filed (though never issued) as early as 1798.

In 1883 John E. Pattison of New Orleans applied for a "Cistern and Tank Cleaner" and the first discovered patent was issued the following year. It swept and scraped the bottom of a cistern or tank and, through a combination of suction and manipulation of the water pressure, was able to separate and remove sediment without removing the water. Over the next 20 years his invention was revised multiple times. Many pool cleaner patents issued in the modern era refer to some of the cistern cleaners as predecessors of their invention.

Early models 

The first swimming pool cleaner was invented in 1912 by Pittsburgh, Pennsylvania citizen John M. Davison. On November 26, 1912, he submitted a patent application to the United States Patent and Trademark Office entitled "Cleaning Apparatus For Swimming Pools And The Like", which was issued on March 25, 1913.

The first suction-side pool cleaner was invented by Roy B. Everson of Chicago in 1937 and was named the "Swimming Pool Cleaner".

In 1953, another notable suction-side pool cleaner was created by Joseph Eistrup, who called his invention "Pool Cleaner". Two years later, the "Automatic Swimming Pool Cleaner" was created by Andrew L. Pansini; it was the first truly automatic pool cleaner and was touted by Pansini as "effective to remove the scum, dirt and other accumulations from both the bottom and sidewalls of a pool to disperse foreign matter in the water for removal therefrom by a normal pump-filter system of the pool".

The first robotic pool cleaner that used electricity was invented by Robert B. Myers in 1967.

The pressure-side cleaner was invented by Melvyn Lane Henkin in 1972. It was called the "Automatic Swimming Pool Cleaner" and it used three wheels to allow the machine "to travel underwater along a random path on the pool vessel surface for dislodging debris therefrom". The design is used in the Polaris Pool Cleaner, a commonly used pool cleaner amongst modern pool owners.

Independently from his American counterparts, Ferdinand Chauvier, a hydraulics engineer who emigrated to South Africa from the Belgian Congo, introduced the Kreepy Krauly in Springs, South Africa, in 1974.

Types 
There are three main types of automated or automatic swimming pool cleaners, classified by the drive mechanism and source of power used: a suction side cleaner, a pressure side cleaner, and an electric robotic cleaner.

Suction-side 
This type of pool cleaner pumps water out of the pool via its skimmer or drains, uses it for locomotion and debris suction, then returns it after being filtered via pool return or outlet valves. This is the least expensive and most popular type of cleaner, and it traces a random course around the pool. This type of cleaner is usually attached via a 1.5-inch hose to a vacuum plate in the skimmer, or a dedicated extraction or "vac" line on the side of the pool. The suction action of the pool's pump provides the needed force for the machine to randomly traverse the floor and walls of the pool, extracting dirt and debris in its path. The first automatic pool cleaner was a suction cleaner.

Suction-side cleaners are the least expensive and most widely used pool cleaners. The price of suction-side cleaners ranges from $250-$650. They are powered solely by the main pump of the pool and utilize the pool's filter system to remove dirt and debris from the water. Suction-side cleaners are best suited for screened-in pools or those with light debris such as sand. Large amounts of debris or larger debris such as leaves and sticks can easily clog the unit or its pump basket. These machines effectively diminish the suction of the main pump - using them will increase the electricity costs and require the main pump and filter system to be serviced more frequently. There are minimal maintenance and part replacement costs on these devices over time.

Pressure-side 
In this design, pool water inflow is further pressurized using a secondary "booster" pump on most but not all models. This high-pressure water is used for locomotion and debris suction to exploit the Venturi effect. The cleaner traces a random course around the pool. The requirement of a booster pump makes pressure-side cleaners the most expensive in terms of electricity use.

The pressure causes turbulence in the water, distributing some debris onto the floor and walls of the pool, some of which are re-floated to the pool surface before being sucked into the main filter through the skimmer inlets. A portion of the dirt and debris is caught in an attached filter bag. Pressure-side cleaners are better suited for handling a heavy amount of debris. They are also better for large debris such as leaves, acorns, and sticks. The purchase cost of this type of cleaner range from $200 to about $700 plus the costs of the booster pump, usually over $200. Some more sophisticated models can cost over $1,000.

Both suction-side and pressure-side cleaners are dependent on the pool's main pump and filter system to remove contaminants from the pool water, which results in the inability to remove particles smaller than the pore size of the pool's existing filter element. Such elements can be sand, diatomaceous earth, zeolite, or other natural or synthetic materials. That particle size ranges from under 5 µm for diatomaceous filters to 50+ µm for sand filters.

Electric robot  
These cleaners are independent of the pool's main filter and pump system and are powered by a separate electricity source, usually in the form of a set-down transformer that is kept at least  from the pool. They have two internal motors: one to suck in water through a self-contained filter bag and eject the filtered water back into the pool, and another that is a drive motor connected to tractor-like rubber or synthetic tracks and "brushes" tied by rubber or plastic bands to a metal shaft.  The brushes, which resemble paint rollers, are located on the front and back of the machine and help remove contaminant particles from the pool's floor and walls (in some designs even the pool steps are included) depending on size and configuration. They also direct the particles into the internal filter bag.

An internal microchip is programmed to control the drive motors. The chip causes the machine to change direction when it reaches a wall or the water surface after climbing the pool walls.

These machines may also be directed by sensors located in the bump bars which, on contact with objects such as a wall, cause a reverse in direction, with a small offset allowing it to move one machine's width over on each crossing of the pool. The delay timer is an important feature for many pools, as many switch off several circulation pumps during the night to allow suspended particles to settle on the bottom of the pool; after a couple of hours, the pool cleaner begins its cleaning cycle. This cleaning cycle is set up to complete before the pumps are turned back on. Although the feature is not necessary for adequate pool cleaning, it saves energy and improves cleaning efficiency.

To move forward and backward and navigate walls and steps, electric robotic cleaners rely on three natural principles: traction and movement caused by the drive motor and tracks, buoyancy created by the large areas inside the machine that fills with air, and the force resulting from the high pressure of water being emitted from the top of the machine that pushes it against the floor and walls. Some electric robotic machines use brushes made out of polyvinyl alcohol (PVA), which has an adhesive quality that allows the unit to cling to the walls, steps, and floors. It is resistant to dirt and oil, which improves its lifespan over rubber or other synthetic materials.

The combination of these three natural principles and an internal mercury switch that tells the microchip that the unit has gone from a horizontal to a vertical position allows it to change direction from ascending to descending the wall at pre-programmed intervals based on the average height of swimming pool walls. Some machines have delayed timers that cause the robot to remain at the waterline, where more dirt accumulates, to momentarily scrub.

The major benefits of these machines are efficiency in time, energy, and cleaning ability and low-maintenance requirements and costs. The major disadvantage is purchase cost which can range from $1,000 to $1,500. The smart navigation system on the product makes it possible to cover the entire area with ease.

Commercial versions 
All commercial pool cleaners are electric robotic and can range in price from a little over $1,000 to upwards of $15,000. They closely resemble residential models but in addition to their addition size, they are made with heavy-duty components, more sophisticated computer guidance, and on-and-off systems. In the US, commercial pool cleaners need to be certified by the National Spa Pool Foundation (NSPF) as Certified Pool Operators (CPO).

Controlling legislation 

There have been attempts for nearly 100 years to mandate the use of pool cleaners, primarily addressed to public pools. The Centers for Disease Control and Prevention in Atlanta, Georgia, on a grant provided by the National Swimming Pool Foundation (NSPF), published the first uniform Model Aquatic Health Code (MAHC).

Historical perspective 
The proposed MAHC is not the first attempt to propose a uniform aquatic health code. The American Public Health Association (APHA) recognized the dangers of improperly maintained aquatic facilities and formed a committee in 1918 that, for the next 66 years, issued eleven "Swimming Pools and Other Public Bathing Places Standards For Design, Construction, Equipment And Operation" recommended ordinances and regulations. But for a variety of reasons none of these recommendations were adopted, at least not formally or completely adopted.

The APHA has tried to develop a uniform aquatic health code, or what is referred to for years as referenced above, and published short reports annually from 1920 through 1925 that it simply referred to as "Report of the Committee On Bathing Places". In 1926 it published its first comprehensive report in its journal: "Standards for Design, Construction, Equipment, and Operation for Swimming Pools and Other Public Bathing Places". Twelve other reports were published through 1981.

However, its lack of authoritative power is implied by the changing description of what was limited to their recommendations or suggestions and the expressed purposes in issuing them. In 1957, it referred to its report as "Recommended Practice for Design, Equipment, and Operation of Swimming Pools and Other Public Bathing Places". The AHPA referred to its report in 1964 as "Suggested Ordinance and Regulations Covering Public Swimming Pools", with a modified one for "Private Swimming Pools" in 1970. Its last report in 1981 was called "Public Swimming Pools: Recommended Regulations for Design and Construction, Operation and Maintenance".

In 1912, coincidentally the same year when the United States Patent and Trademark Office issued the first patent for a swimming pool cleaner, the Sanitary Engineering Section of the APHA convened in New York City to lay the groundwork for the first recommended pool and spa regulations. As reported in the American Journal of Public Health in April 1912, a meeting was held in Havana the previous December. One of the subjects being studied at the New York meeting was the "Hygiene of swimming pools".

In 1918, a committee on swimming pools was appointed at the APHA's annual meeting in Chicago and a similar committee was appointed at the meeting in Washington, D.C., two years later. Despite their intended and published goals, none became law, uniform, much less national.

None of the proposed Standards included more than a passing reference of the need to properly clean a pool. A few, but not all of these recommended ordinances and regulations, related to the use of a vacuum, though the first that included any specificity in 1923 at least required a certain level of clarity. The 1921 report, barely a few pages in length, made this reference to the need to clean the pool:

The 1923 report of the American Journal of Public Health, Sanitary Engineering Section American Public Health Association read before the Sanitary Engineering Section of the American Public Health Association at the Fifty-second Annual Meeting at Boston, Massachusetts, October 8, 1923. slightly longer, but still very brief, stated:

It also stated:

In 1921, the fact that infectious material, namely pathogens collect in the pool and should be removed was recognized.

It was not until 1926 that the first true report was issued and later published in the Journal of the American Public Health Association. Of all of its reports from 1920 through 1981, the first major report by the APHA in 1926, written in narrative form as were the succeeding nine until 1957, the committee included the detailed provisions relating to pool cleaning, vacuuming and vacuums:

The 1964 report included the following language:

The CDC was founded (in 1946), followed by the Cabinet-level Department of Health, Education and Welfare (in 1953), now the Department of Health, and Human Services and its eleven operating divisions, the National Health Service Corps (in 1977), and a variety of private and non-profit aquatic organizations such as the National Spa and Pool Association (in 1956), now the Association of Pool and Spa Professionals the National Swimming Pool Foundation (in 1965).

A variety of states and jurisdictions have codified the requirement of inclusion of an independent vacuum cleaner, including the two states with the highest number and concentration of both residential and public pools:

California: 2010 Title 24, Part 2, Vol. 2 California Building Code. Section 3140B, Cleaning Systems:

Florida: Florida Department of Health section 64E-9.007 Recirculation and Treatment System Requirements:

Call to action 
In 2005 the CDC, in response to growing concern and feared epidemic with the pathogen Cryptosporidium, much like the APHA did in 1912, gathered many of the United States' foremost medical and scientific experts to study the concern for aquatic health. As a result, in 2007 they began to consolidate a uniform aquatic health code.

Each health and safety segment was assigned to a committee to study it and draft a proposed module open for public comment before being adopted and recommended to the nation's 3200+ state and local health agencies that enact ordinances and regulations for swimming pools and spa and other aquatic facilities, inspect and monitor the facilities, and enforce the regulations. Since the focus of the MAHC was to respond to the threat of Cryptosporidium the Technical Committee of Recirculation Systems and Filtration is a major focus.

University of North Carolina Charlotte Associate Professor James Amburgey conducted many tests to evaluate existing swimming pool filters and he concluded that they have been extremely ineffective in removing Cryptosporidium in most cases.

See also 
 Domestic robot
 Hot tub
 Robotic vacuum cleaner
 Swimming pool
 Water purification

References

Further reading 
 United States Bureau of the Census. Statistical abstract of the United States, 1995. 115th ed. Washington, DC: US
 Yoder J, Blackburn B, Levy DA, Craun GF, Calderon RL "Surveillance for waterborne-disease outbreaks associated with recreational water—the United States", Beach MJ. 2001-2002. Surveillance Summaries, October 22, 2004.
 Progress of the U.S. Model Aquatic Health Code Project World Conference on Drowning Prevention May 13, 2011, Da Nang, Vietnam.
 William R. Peterson, PH.D. and Renee E. Berman A New Method For Removing and Inactivating Water-borne Pathogens Utilizing Saline Treated Materials Coating Systems Laboratories, Inc.
 Making Waves in the Aquatics Industry 2005 International Symposium on Household Water Management, Model Health Code.
 New Code Aims at Standards for Nation's Pools
 Delaunay A. Gargala, G, Li X, Favennec, L, Ballet JJ, "Quantitative Flow Cytometric Evaluation of Maximal Cryptosporidium Parvum Oocyst Infectivity in a Neonate Mouse Model", Applied and Environmental Microbiology, Volume 66, Issue 10, p. 4315.
 Huw. V. Smith, Rosely, A. B. Nicols, Anthony M. Grimason, "Cryptosporidium excystation and invasion: getting to the guts of the matter", Trends in Parasitology volume 21, Issue3, March 2002, pp. 133–142.
 Okhuysen PC, Chappell CL, Crabb JH, Sterling CR, Dupont HL "Virulence of three distinct Cryptosporidium parvum isolates for healthy adults", Journal of Infectious Diseases, Volume 180, Issue 4, pp. 1275–128
 Capet C. Kapel N, Huneau JF, Magne D, Laikuen R, Tricottet V, Benhamou Y, Tome D, Gobert JG "Cryptosporidium par-vum Infection in Suckling Rats: Impairment of Mucosal Permeability and Na+-Glucose Cotransport", Experimental Parasitology. Volume 91, Issue 2, February 1999, pp. 119–125, Water Quality Criteria, 1972"
 A report of the Committee on Water Quality Criteria Environmental Studies Board, National Academy of Sciences National Academy of Engineering, Washington, D.C., 1972-EPA-United States Environmental Protection Agency. The United States Environmental Protection Agency Guide, 2 Swimming Pool Architects, and Building Branch at the Department for Education (DFE).
 Gordon Nichols, Rachel Chalmers, lain Lake, Will Sopwith, Martyn Regan, Paul Hunter, Pippa Grenfell, Flo Harrison, Chris Lane, Cryptosporidiosis. A report on the surveillance and epidemiology of Cryptosporidium and epidemiology of Cryptosporidium infection in England and Wales
 Jennifer L. Clancy, Karl G. Linden, Randi M. McCuin Cryptosporidium Occurrence in Wastewaters and Control Using UV Disinfection International Ultra-Violet Association- Volume 6, Issue 3
 "In Search of Crypto's Achilles Heel", University of Georgia Research Magazine
 Guidelines for Safe Recreational Water Environments Volume 2 Swimming Pools and Similar Environments World Health Organization
 Franz J. Maier "A System for Fluoridating Individual Water Supplies", American Journal of Public Health, Volume 48, Issue 6, June 1958
 Fiona L. Henriquez, Thomas A. Richards, Fiona Roberts, Rima McLeod and Craig W. Roberts "The unusual mitochondrial compartment of Cryptosporidium parvum" -X. Trends in Parasitology, Volume 21, Issue 2, February 2005
 James E. Amburgey, Kimberly J. Walsh, Roy R. Fielding and Michael J. Arrowood "Removal of Cryptosporidium and polystyrene microspheres from swimming pool water with sand, cartridge, and pre-coat filters", Journal of Water and Health, Volume 10, Issue 1, pp. 31–42
 Paul A. Rochelle, Steve J. Upton, Beth A Montelone and Keith Woods "The response of Cryptosporidium parvum to UV light", Trends in Parasitology, Volume 21, Issue 2, February 2005, pp. 80–87
 James E. Amburgey and J. Brian Anderson Disposable swim diaper retention of Cryptosporidium-sized particles on human subjects in a recreational water setting, Journal of Water and Health, Volume 9, Issue 4, September 2011, pp. 653–658
 James E. Amburgey "Removal of Cryptosporidium-Sized Polystyrene Microspheres from Swimming Pool Water with a Sand Filter with and without Added Perlite Filter Media", Journal of Environmental Engineering, Volume 137, Issue 12, December 1, 2011, pp. 1205–1208
 J. Lepage P. Rouvroy D, Vandepitte, J "Cryptosporidium spp., a frequent cause of diarrhea in Central Africa Bogaerts", Journal of Clinical Microbiology, Volume 20, Issue 5, November 1984, pp. 874–876
 Thulin JD, Kuhlenschmidt MS, Rolsma MD, Current WL, Gelberg HB "An intestinal xenograft model for Cryptosporidium parvum infection". Department of Veterinary Pathobiology, College of Veterinary Medicine, University of Illinois Urbana 61801, Infection and Immunity, Volume 62, Issue 1, January 1994, pp. 329–331
 "Neutralization of cryptosporidium parvum sporozoites by immunoglobulin and non-immunoglobulin components in serum-Hill", BD. Dawson AM, Blewett, DA, Research in Veterinary Science, Volume 54, Issue 3, May 1993, pp. 356–360
 Moredun Research Institute, Edinburgh, "Characterization of cyclophosphamide-rat model of cryptosporidiosis", Rehg JE, Hancock ML, Woodmansee DB., Infection and Immunity Volume 55, Issue 11, November 1987, pp. 2669–2674, Comparative Medicine Division, St. Jude Children's Research Hospital, Memphis Tennessee 38101
 James E. Amburgey, Kimberly J. Walsh, Roy R. Fielding and Michael J. Arrowood Removal of Cryptosporidium and polystyrene microspheres from swimming pool water with sand, cartridge, and precoat filters, IWA Publishing 2012
 B T Croll, C R Hayes, C J Wright, S Williams, and D. Rowlands Optimisation of pool water filtration for Cryptosporidium oocyst removal and new research Swansea University, Wales, Biofilm- A Nasty that's in your Pool! Professional Pool Operators of America, 2012
 Michael Unger The Role of the Schmutzdecke in Pathogen Removal in Slow Sand and Riverbank Filtration Presenta-tions/unger_schmutzdecke.pdf, University of New Hampshire
 Equipment for Swimming Pools, Spas, Hot Tubs, and Other Recreational Water Facilities. National Sanitation Foundation International Standard
 Kuan Mu Yao, Mohammad T. Habibian, and Charles R. O'Melia Water and Waste Water Filtration: Concepts and Applications. Environmental Science & Technology, Volume 5, Issue 11, November 1971

Swimming pool equipment
Cleaning
Domestic robots